The Indigenous Literacy Foundation (ILF) is an Australian not-for-profit founded in 2011 that works to address the educational disadvantages faced by Indigenous Australian children and young people by providing access to books and literacy programs.

ILF was set up in 2011, taking over from the Indigenous Literacy Project (ILP) which had been associated with The Fred Hollows Foundation. In 2010 the ILP had raised $607,000. Juliet Rogers, formerly CEO of Murdoch Books, was the inaugural chair.

Patrons of the ILF, as of 2021, are Quentin Bryce  (appointed February 2015) and June Oscar  (appointed September 2019).

Lifetime ambassadors of the ILF include Justine Clarke, Andy Griffiths, Kate Grenville, Anita Heiss, Alison Lester, David Malouf and Josh Pyke.

In September 2021 Karen Williams, who had been member of the ILP and executive director of the ILF, stepped down and was replaced by Ben Bowen as Chief Executive Officer, with Mike Milnes appointed Chief Operating Officer.

The ILF was nominated for the Astrid Lindgren Memorial Award in 2021 in which it was unsuccessful, and is a nominee again 2022.

Indigenous Literacy Day 
Each year the ILF organises and promotes Indigenous Literacy Day, held in the first week of September.

References 

Educational charities based in Australia
Organizations established in 2011
Non-profit organisations based in New South Wales
2011 establishments in Australia
Indigenous Australian literature